The 12797 / 12798 Venkatadri Express is a Superfast train belonging to Indian Railways, connecting Kacheguda in Hyderabad (Telangana) to Chittoor in Andhra Pradesh.

Route & Halts

Loco link
Both trains are hauled by a Guntakal-based WDM-3A / WDM-3D twins or Gooty-based WDP-4D diesel locomotive from Kacheguda to Chittoor and vice versa.

References 

Transport in Hyderabad, India
Transport in Chittoor district
Rail transport in Telangana
Rail transport in Andhra Pradesh
Named passenger trains of India
Express trains in India